East 148th Avenue station is a MAX light rail station in Portland, Oregon. It serves the Blue Line and is the 17th stop eastbound on the current Eastside MAX branch.  It is located at the intersection of East Burnside Street and NE/SE 148th Avenue, serving the Hazelwood, Glenfair and Wilkes neighborhoods. The MAX system is owned and operated by TriMet, the major transit agency for the Portland metropolitan area.

External links
Station information (with eastbound ID number) from TriMet
Station information (with westbound ID number) from TriMet
MAX Light Rail Stations – more general TriMet page

MAX Light Rail stations
MAX Blue Line
1986 establishments in Oregon
Railway stations in the United States opened in 1986
Railway stations in Portland, Oregon